Acianthus cuneatus, commonly known as New England mosquito orchid, is a species of flowering plant in the orchid family Orchidaceae and is endemic to the Northern Tablelands of New South Wales. It is a terrestrial herb with a single, heart-shaped leaf and up to seven translucent greenish flowers with purplish stripes and is found growing in sheltered slopes in open forest.

Description
Acianthus cuneatus is a terrestrial, perennial, deciduous, sympodial herb with a single heart-shaped, glabrous, dark green leaf that is purplish on its lower surface. Flowering occurs from February to April.

Taxonomy and naming
Acianthus cuneatus was first formally described by in 2017 David Jones and Lachlan Mackenzie Copeland and the description was published in Australian Orchid Review from specimens collected on Mount Duval in 1994. The specific epithet (cuneatus) is a Latin word meaning "wedge-shaped", referring to the shape of the labellum

Distribution and habitat
This orchid grows on slopes and in sheltered areas in tall open forest on the higher parts of the Northern Tableland between Coolah Tops and Tenterfield in New South Wales.

References 

cuneatus
Orchids of New South Wales
Endemic orchids of Australia
Plants described in 2017
Taxa named by David L. Jones (botanist)
Taxa named by Lachlan Mackenzie Copeland